Víctor García León (born 1976) is a Spanish filmmaker.

Biography 
Born in Madrid in 1976, he is the son of film director José Luis García Sánchez and singer . He made his directorial debut in a feature film with the 2001 teen drama No Pain, No Gain, which earned him a nomination to the Goya Award for Best New Director. The latter was followed by Go Away from Me (2006),  (2017) and The Europeans (2020). He completed the shooting of his fifth feature, No haberlos tenido, in 2021.
He has also worked in television series such as the Juan Carrasco television saga (Vota Juan, Vamos Juan,  and Venga Juan), The Neighbor, and Los hombres de Paco.

References 

Living people
1976 births
Spanish film directors
Spanish television directors
21st-century Spanish screenwriters
Spanish male screenwriters